Henry Olavi "Remu" Aaltonen (born 10 January 1948) is a Finnish drummer and singer. He is the lead musician of the band Hurriganes, but has also pursued a solo singing career.

Aaltonen was born in Helsinki. He was the oldest child in a family of seven siblings and one foster child. He is of Romani descent. For a while the family lived in an abandoned train car near the construction of the Helsinki Airport. The family's father was not always around, and the mother sold moonshine to support them.

Aaltonen was 16 years old and already playing in various bands when he received his first prison sentence for burglaries and other property crimes in 1964. He has also received convictions for drug possession. In 1974, Hurriganes had to pause their tour for a few months while Aaltonen was in prison. Aaltonen has said that his music career saved him from a life of crime.

In 2018, Aaltonen was awarded the Suomi-palkinto (Finland Award) by the Finnish Ministry of Education and Culture as a recognition of an impactful career in the field of arts.

Discography

Solo albums 

  (1978)
  (1981)
  (1982))
  (1983))
  (1985, EP)
  (1985, live)
  (1987)
 :  (1994)
  (1995)
  (1999)
  (2004)
  (2013)

Other albums 
  (2007)
  (2008)
 Remu and His All Stars: Live at Tullikamari (2018)

Collections 
 Parhaat (1987)
 Collection (1990)
 Mad About You (1992)
 Suomen Parhaat – Remu (1994)
  (1995)
 Remu & Hurriganes:  (1997)
  (2008)
  (2008)

Singles 
 "" (1986)
 "" (2009)

Bibliography

References

External links

1948 births
Living people
Finnish musicians
Finnish people of Romani descent
Musicians from Helsinki
Romani singers